Southdown High School was a segregated school for black people in Houma, Louisiana. It was a part of Terrebonne Parish School District

It opened in 1946 as Houma Colored High School, and in 1949 it became Southtown High School. In 1952 grades 6-12 began classes and in 1953 the first class graduated. Its name changed to Southdown High School when it moved into its final location, a St. Charles Street building. Its books originated from the then-white Terrebonne High School and South Terrebonne High School. Eventually it became a grade 9-12 school. In 1969 the school closed following desegregation, and students moved to South Terrebonne High School and Terrebonne High School.

References

Schools in Terrebonne Parish, Louisiana
Public K-12 schools in Louisiana
1946 establishments in Louisiana
Educational institutions established in 1946
1969 disestablishments in Louisiana
Educational institutions disestablished in 1969
Historically segregated African-American schools in Louisiana